Lindbergh is a Swedish surname which may refer to:

People
Anne Lindbergh (1940-1993), U.S. children's author, daughter of the famous pilot Charles Lindbergh
Anne Morrow Lindbergh (1906–2001), U.S. author and aviator; wife of Charles Lindbergh
August Lindbergh (1808–1893), Swedish-American farmer and politician 
Charles August Lindbergh (1859–1924), U.S. Congressman and father of the famous pilot Charles Lindbergh
Charles Lindbergh (1902–1974), first pilot to fly solo non-stop across the Atlantic
Jon Lindbergh (1932–2021), U.S. diver and demolition expert, son of the famous pilot Charles Lindbergh
Erik Lindbergh (born c. 1965), U.S. aviator; grandson of the famous pilot Charles Lindbergh
Pelle Lindbergh (1959–1985), Swedish ice hockey player
Peter Lindbergh (1944–2019), German fashion photographer

Places
 Lindbergh, Alberta, a hamlet in the County of St. Paul No. 19, Alberta, Canada
 Lindbergh, Atlanta, officially Lindbergh/Morosgo, neighborhood of Atlanta, Georgia
 Lindbergh Boulevard, a section of Missouri state highway running through St. Louis
 Lindbergh Center (MARTA station), a passenger rail station in Atlanta, Georgia
 Lindbergh Field, also known as San Diego International Airport
 Lindbergh High School (St. Louis, Missouri), a high school named after Charles Lindbergh, the aviator.
 Lindbergh Senior High School (Renton, Washington), a high school named after Charles Lindbergh, the aviator
 Lindbergh Range, in Greenland

Astronomy
 Lindbergh (crater), a lunar crater named after Charles Lindbergh
 Lindbergh rock mound, in Endeavour Crater, Mars

Other 
 "Lindbergh (The Eagle of the U.S.A.)", a 1927 popular song written by Howard Johnson and Al Sherman
 Lindbergh's grass mouse, a rodent species from South America
 Lindbergh kidnapping, the abduction and murder of the son of Charles and Anne Lindbergh
 "Lindbergh Law", a nickname for the Federal Kidnapping Act adopted in response to the Lindbergh kidnapping
 Lindbergh (book), a 1999 Pulitzer Prize winning biography by A. Scott Berg
 Sega Lindbergh, an arcade system board developed by Sega
 GoJet Airlines, callsign "Lindbergh" after Charles Lindbergh

See also 

 
 
 Lindberg (surname), for people with that spelling of the surname
 Lindberg (disambiguation), for other uses of the name
 Lindy (disambiguation)

Swedish-language surnames